Stilesville is a hamlet in Delaware County, New York. It is located northeast of Deposit at the intersection of NY Route 8 and NY Route 10. The West Branch Delaware River flows west through the hamlet.

References

Geography of Delaware County, New York
Hamlets in Delaware County, New York
Hamlets in New York (state)